Claude Auguste Court (24 September 1793 – 21 January 1880) was a French soldier and mercenary.

He was hired by Maharaja Ranjit Singh of Punjab in 1827 to organize and train the artillery. He was promoted to the rank of general, and served as one of the leading European officers in the Punjab Army

Early life
Court was born at Saint-Cézaire-sur-Siagne, France, on 24 September 1793. He was educated at the Ecole Polytechnique in Paris.

Military career in French army
In 1813, he joined the French army. After Napoleon's defeat in the Waterloo in 1815 he was dismissed from service. He left France in 1818 for Baghdad and joined the Persian forces which were trained at Kermanshah by a handful of ex-officers of Napoleon's army including Jean-Baptiste Ventura. While in Persia, he met Paolo Avitabile, another Neapolitan adventurer, and together they travelled on to Lahore reaching there in early 1827.

Military services with Maharaja Ranjit Singh of Punjab

Maharaja Ranjit Singh gave Court employment in the artillery befitting his talents and scientific attainments. Court was responsible for the training of artillerymen, the organization of batteries and the establishment of arsenals and magazines on European lines. The Maharaja had his own foundries for casting guns and for the manufacture of shells. Court supervised these in collaboration with Sardar Lehna Singh Majithia.

When Court produced the first shell at the Lahore foundry, the Maharaja bestowed upon him a prize of Rs 30,000, and when he produced the fuse, he was rewarded with an award of Rs 5,000. Court received a salary of Rs 2,500 per month, besides a jagir.

Expedition and battles

He took part in the expedition of Peshawar (1834) and the battle of Jamrud (1837).
He was promoted to general in 1836.

Role during struggle for succession of Ranjit Singh

Claude Auguste Court continued to serve the State after the death of Maharaja Ranjit Singh.
After the death of Kanvar Nau Nihal Singh on 5 November 1840, Court along with Ventura sided with Sher Singh who was installed as Maharaja, with their help in investing the Fort of Lahore, on 20 January 1841.

Later life and death

After Maharaja Sher Singh's assassination in September 1843, he fled to Firozpur, in British territory, and, ultimately securing his discharge from the Sikh army, proceeded with his Punjabi wife, Fezli Azam Joo and the children to France in 1844. He purchased an estate in the countryside and a residence in the city of Paris where he lived until his death in 1880. A very useful overview of Court's life in India is found in Jean-Marie Lafont's book Indika: Essays in Indo-French Relations, 1630-1976 [New Delhi, 2000]. Lafont presents an enormous amount of new information of the 'French Generals" serving in Lahore in the 1820s-30s as well as the intellectual interest France showed in all things Indian in the 19th century.

Interest in Numismatics 
Court was one of the first Europeans to become interested in the coins of South Asia, which he collected from 1829. Part of the collection was described in Revue Numismatique in 1839 and Court talks of his coin collection in his valuable Memoires published in Paris in 1856-57. Court died in Paris in January 1880 leaving his heirs his rich coin collection. We know almost nothing of its fate since then until three albums came to light in an English book sale. They contained 627 coin rubbings, allowing many of Court's coins to be identified. These had been bought by a coin collector, Alexander Cunningham, whose collection was acquired by the British Museum in 1888–94. Cunningham may also have owned the albums.

See also
Paolo Avitabile
France-Asia relations
Fauj-i-Khas
Ranjit Singh

References

French mercenaries
History of Sikhism
History of Punjab
Military history of India
Mercenaries in India